All (subtitled The United States of Mind Phase 3) is an album by jazz pianist Horace Silver released on the Blue Note label in 1972, featuring performances by Silver with Cecil Bridgewater, Harold Vick, Richie Resnicoff, Bob Cranshaw and Mickey Roker, with vocals by Andy Bey, Salome Bey and Gail Nelson. It is the third of a trilogy of albums later compiled on CD as The United States of Mind.

The Allmusic review awarded the album 1½ stars.

Track listing 
All compositions by Horace Silver
 "The Merger of the Minds" - 4:47
 "Cause and Effect" - 4:14
 "Forever Is a Long Long Time" - 3:50
 "My Soul Is My Computer" - 4:38
 "How Much Does Matter Really Matter" - 3:09
 "Horn of Life" - 6:27
 "Who Has the Answer" - 3:42
 "From the Heart Through the Mind" - 3:28
 "All" - 5:39
 "Summary" - 2:35

Recorded on January 17 (2, 3, 5, 7 & 8), and February 14 (1, 4, 6, 9 & 10), 1972.

Personnel 
 Horace Silver - electric piano, vocals
 Cecil Bridgewater - trumpet, flugelhorn (1, 4, 6, 10)
 Harold Vick - tenor saxophone (1, 4, 6 & 10)
 Richie Resnicoff - guitar (1, 10)
 Bob Cranshaw - electric bass (1-4, 6-10)
 Mickey Roker - drums (1-4, 6-10)
 Salome Bey - vocals (1, 3, 4, 9-10), Andy Bey (1, 2, 7-10), Gail Nelson (1, 5, 9-10) - vocals

References 

Horace Silver albums
1972 albums
Blue Note Records albums
Albums produced by Francis Wolff
Albums produced by George Butler (record producer)
Albums recorded at Van Gelder Studio